244 (two hundred [and] forty-four) is the natural number following 243 and preceding 245.

Additionally, 244 is:
the sum of two nonzero fifth powers.
palindromic in bases 3 (1000013), 11 (20211), 60 (4460), 121 (22121), 243 (11243).
a Harshad number in bases 3, 9, 11, 61, 62, 81, 121, 122, 123 and 184.
the second anti-perfect number, meaning that reversing the digits of the proper divisors of 244 and adding the results gives 244 back again.
part of the sequence 1, 2, 4, 8, 61, 221, 244, ... in which each number is formed by reversing the digits of the double of the previous number.
the number of non-isomorphic set-systems of weight 8

References

Integers